There have been four battles fought near the town of Fleurus in Belgium:

The Battle of Fleurus (1622) in the Thirty Years' War
The Battle of Fleurus (1690) in the Nine Years' War
The Battle of Fleurus (1794) in the French Revolutionary Wars
The Battle of Ligny (Battle of Fleurus, 1815) in the Napoleonic Wars